The Yamaha TDR250 was a street-legal  middleweight dual-sport bike produced by Japanese motorcycle manufacturer Yamaha between 1988 and 1993. 

It was powered by the naturally-aspirated, crankcase reed-valve inducted, liquid-cooled 249cc parallel-twin two-stroke engine from the first generation TZR250 (this same engine also powered the R1-Z). This engine featured the 'YPVS' Yamaha Power Valve System, CDI ignition and digital spark advance . Almost all of the engine, gearbox, and electrical  components are interchangeable with the TZR and R1-Z.

The TDR was designed to provide agile handling and quick acceleration both on and off the road, and power delivery was modified to suit its intended use . The special upswept expansion chambers, unique to the TDR, part of this; as well as aiding ground clearance. The bike was originally released in a 250cc format, but a 240cc derivative was also produced exclusively for the French market.

Specifications of TDR 250

Note: []= French Model

External links
[Yamaha Global - https://global.yamaha-motor.com/]

TDR 250
Dual-sport motorcycles
Motorcycles introduced in 1988
Motorcycles powered by straight-twin engines